This was a Portuguese nobility title granted by King Luís I of Portugal to António José de Ávila, 1st Duke of Ávila and Bolama, a remarkable Portuguese politician and ambassador during the liberal period.

Originally, the title was granted, in 1864 as Count of Ávila (in Portuguese Conde de Ávila) and it was successively upgraded, by the same King, to Marquis of Ávila and Bolama (Marquês de Ávila e Bolama) in 1870, and finally by a royal decree dated from May 14, 1878, to Duke of Ávila and Bolama (Duque de Ávila e Bolama). 

This was the first Dukedom to be granted to a commoner; in Portugal the title of Duke was traditionally granted to members of high nobility and especially to members of the royal family, such as the second sons of monarchs.

List of the dukes, marquesses and counts
António José de Ávila (1806-1881), 1st Count of Ávila (1864), 1st Marquis of Ávila and Bolama (1870), 1st Duke of Ávila and Bolama (1878);
António José de Ávila (1842-1917), nephew of the 1st Duke. 2nd Count of Ávila and 2nd Marquis of Ávila and Bolama. 33rd Mayor of Lisbon (1901-1903);
Manuel de Carvalho de Ávila (1876-1979), inherited from his uncle the title of 3rd Count of Ávila.

See also
Dukedoms in Portugal
List of prime ministers of Portugal
List of mayors of Lisbon

External links
Genealogy of the Dukes of Ávila and Bolama, in Portuguese
Genealogy of the Marquesses of Ávila and Bolama, in Portuguese
Genealogy of the Counts of Ávila, in Portuguese

Bibliography
”Nobreza de Portugal e do Brasil" – Vol. II, pages 348/351. Published by Zairol Lda., Lisbon 1989.

 
Dukedoms of Portugal
Avila
Horta, Azores
1864 establishments in Portugal